Thomas Percy Homer (April 1886 – ?) was an English footballer who played as a forward. Born in Winson Green, Warwickshire. He played for Soho Caledonians, Erdington, Aston Villa, Stourbridge, Kidderminster Harriers and Manchester United.

External links
Profile at StretfordEnd.co.uk
Profile at MUFCInfo.com

1886 births
English footballers
Association football forwards
Aston Villa F.C. players
Stourbridge F.C. players
Kidderminster Harriers F.C. players
Manchester United F.C. players
Year of death missing